James Brennan may refer to:

Politicians
 James F. Brennan (born 1952), American politician in the New York State Assembly
 James B. Brennan (1926–2021), American politician the Wisconsin State Senate
 James F. Brennan (mayor) (1916–2002), American politician, mayor of Somerville, Massachusetts
 James Brennan (Queensland politician) (1837–1917), Australian politician, member of the Queensland Legislative Assembly

Sports
Don Brennan (baseball) (James Donald Brennan, 1903–1953), American Major League Baseball pitcher
Jim Brennan (baseball) (1862–1914), American baseball player
Jim Brennan (Australian footballer) (1927–2013), Australian rules footballer
Jim Brennan (born 1977), Canadian soccer player and manager, also known as Jimmy Brennan
Jim Brennan (Northern Irish footballer) (1932–2009), Northern Irish footballer
James Brennan (footballer) (1884–1917), Irish footballer
Jamie Brennan (born  1996/7), Irish Gaelic footballer
Séamus Ó Braonáin (Jimmy Brennan, 1881–1970), Irish sportsman and public figure

Others

 James Herbert Brennan (born 1940), Northern Irish lecturer and author
 James Alexander Brennan (1885–1956), American songwriter
 James Brennan, a character in the film Adventureland